Ryan Marc Edwards (born 17 November 1993) is an Australian professional football player who plays as a midfielder for SD Amorebieta.

Born in Singapore, Edwards played youth soccer at the Australian Institute of Sport and for Reading before making his professional debut for Perth Glory on loan in 2013. In 2015, Edwards left Reading to join Scottish Premiership club Partick Thistle. Edwards left Thistle after they were relegated in 2018, and signed for Hearts.

He has represented Australia at under-20 and under-23 level. In March 2017 Edwards was called up to the senior Australian national team.

Early life
Edwards was born in Singapore. Despite having been in the country for around 10 days after his birth, Edwards was called up for national service for Singapore on his 18th birthday. He was able to wait until age 21 and have his citizenship renounced, therefore avoiding conscription. His father, Alistair, is a former Australian international and his mother is a Singaporean national, and his older brother Cameron is also a professional footballer.

Club career

Reading
On 29 April 2011, it was announced he had signed with Championship side Reading along with his older brother Cameron.

In April 2015, Edwards announced he'd been informed by Reading that they would not be renewing his contract, which expired that summer, with his release from Reading confirmed on 21 May.

Perth Glory (loan)
On 16 July 2013, Edwards left Reading on a season long loan to Perth Glory, then managed by his father Alistair and featuring his brother Cameron. Edwards made his debut for Perth Glory on 13 October 2013 in their first game of the 2013–14 season, a 3–1 away defeat to Adelaide United.

Partick Thistle
Following his release from Reading, Edwards' went on trial with Crawley Town. and trained with Manchester City in the lead up to Australia U-23's matches in September 2015.

On 24 September 2015, Edwards signed a one-year contract with Scottish Premiership side Partick Thistle. Edwards made his Partick Thistle debut in a 3–0 win over Dundee United coming on as a substitute Edwards scored his first goal for Partick Thistle in a 2–1 victory against Hamilton Academical at New Douglas Park on 19 March 2016. On 1 April 2016, Edwards extended his contract with Partick Thistle, until the end of the 2016–17 season. Edwards contract was again extended, this time until the end of the 2017/18 season, on 17 November 2016, after the midfielder had triggered an extension.

On 30 June 2016 Edwards signed a contract extension to stay at Partick Thistle until summer 2020. Thistle were relegated via the playoffs at the end of the 2017/18 season. Following that relegation, Edwards invoked a clause in his contract which allowed him to leave Thistle immediately.

Heart of Midlothian
On 6 June 2018, Edwards signed a two-year contract with Hearts. At the end of August 2018, Edwards was loaned to St Mirren. Ryan Edwards returned to Hearts in January 2019 after stating his desire to return and play for the club. Edwards made his debut in the Edinburgh Derby against Hibernian, helping them to a 1-1 draw. He made his first start the following week against Kilmarnock.
Edwards scored in the 2019 Scottish Cup Final to give Hearts the lead in an eventual 2–1 defeat to Celtic.

Busan IPark
On 5 July 2021, Edwards joined Busan IPark of K League 2.

SD Amorebieta
On 7 March 2023, Edwards signed for Primera Federación Group 2 club SD Amorebieta.

International career
Edwards has captained the Australia national under-20 association football team, and was a member of the Australian squad that went to the 2013 FIFA U-20 World Cup. He was part of the U-23 squad that took part in the 2013 AFC U-22 Championship in Oman, and the 2016 AFC U-23 Championship in Qatar.  In March 2017 Edwards was called up to the senior Australian national team.

Career statistics

Honours 
Heart of Midlothian
 Scottish Cup: runner-up: 2018–19

Individual
Burton Albion Player of the Year: 2020–21

See also
List of association football families
List of Reading F.C. players (1–24 appearances)

References

External links

 

1993 births
Living people
Australian soccer players
Australian expatriate sportspeople in England
Australia youth international soccer players
Australian people of Singaporean descent
Sportsmen from New South Wales
Association football midfielders
Australian Institute of Sport soccer players
Reading F.C. players
Perth Glory FC players
Partick Thistle F.C. players
English Football League players
A-League Men players
Scottish Professional Football League players
Soccer players from Sydney
Heart of Midlothian F.C. players
St Mirren F.C. players
Burton Albion F.C. players